Eldorado is a Canadian drama film, released in 1995. Directed by Charles Binamé and written by Binamé and Lorraine Richard in conjunction with its main stars, the film focuses on six young residents of Montreal trying to make sense of their directionless lives.

The film's main cast includes Pascale Bussières as Rita, Robert Brouillette as Marc, James Hyndman as Lloyd, Macha Limonchik as Loulou, Pascale Montpetit as Henriette and Isabel Richer as Roxan.

The film garnered eight Genie Award nominations at the 16th Genie Awards, including Best Actress nods for Bussières, Montpetit and Richer, Best Supporting Actor for Brouillette, Best Director for Binamé, Best Art Direction or Production Design, Best Costume Design and Best Editing.

Production
The film had a budget of $1.5 million.

References

Works cited

External links

1995 films
Canadian drama films
1990s French-language films
Films directed by Charles Binamé
Films set in Montreal
French-language Canadian films
1990s Canadian films